Berosus undatus is a species of hydrophilid beetles from the United States, Mexico, the Lesser Antilles and Cuba.

References

Hydrophilinae
Beetles described in 1792
Insects of the United States